Robert James Anderson (May 29, 1966 – July 20, 2006) was an American criminal convicted and executed for the murder of a five-year-old girl. He was born in Great Lakes, Illinois.

Crimes
Anderson kidnapped and murdered five-year-old Audra Ann Reeves, in Amarillo, Texas on June 9, 1992.  Anderson told police that he kidnapped Reeves as she was returning home from playing in a park. He took her inside his house and raped her. He beat, stabbed, and drowned Reeves, then stored her body in a styrofoam ice chest.  Her body was found that day by a neighbor throwing out trash.  Anderson was identified as the person who discarded the chest, was apprehended by police, and confessed almost immediately.

Anderson said he committed the crime after a dispute with his wife of eight months.  The Associated Press quoted Anderson as saying, "The whole day revolved around the fight.  She stormed out of the house and said when she returned she didn't want to find me."

Execution
Anderson was sentenced to death and was executed by lethal injection in Texas on July 20, 2006. He is buried at Captain Joe Byrd Cemetery.

See also
 Capital punishment in Texas
 Capital punishment in the United States
 List of people executed in Texas, 2000–2009
 List of people executed in the United States in 2006

Footnotes

References
 Offender Information. Texas Department of Criminal Justice. Retrieved on 2013-07-11.
 Last Statement. Texas Department of Criminal Justice. Retrieved on 2013-07-11.
 Robert James Anderson. The Clark County Prosecuting Attorney. Retrieved on 2007-11-17.

1966 births
2006 deaths
1992 murders in the United States
21st-century executions by Texas
21st-century executions of American people
American murderers of children
American people convicted of murder
Executed people from Illinois
People convicted of murder by Texas
People executed by Texas by lethal injection
American people executed for murder
People from Great Lakes, Illinois